Murrumba may refer to:
 Murrumba Homestead Grounds, the homestead of Thomas Petrie in Petrie, Queensland, Australia
 Electoral district of Murrumba, an electoral district in Queensland, Australia
 Electoral results for the district of Murrumba
 Murrumba Downs, Queensland, a suburb in Queensland, Australia
 Murrumba Downs railway station